Carol Bowman M.S. (born October 14, 1950) is an author, lecturer, counselor, and therapist, known for her work in studying alleged cases of reincarnation, especially those involving young children.

Biography 

Her first two books, Children's Past Lives (Bantam, 1997) and Return from Heaven (HarperCollins, 2001), about reincarnation, have been published in more than twenty three languages. Bowman has also been a practicing past life regression therapist for adults for more than twenty-five years and conducts training courses to teach practicing  therapists her method of past life regression therapy.  She studied with pioneers Morris Netherton and Roger Woolger in the field of past life regression, and holds an M.S. in counseling from Villanova University, after graduating from Simmons College in Boston.

She has appeared on many TV and radio programs, including Oprah, Good Morning America, Unsolved Mysteries, ABC Primetime, "The Katie Couric Show", and The Art Bell Show, as well as shows on A&E, Discovery Channel and the BBC.  She has lectured in Norway, Belgium, Spain, Ireland, and the Netherlands, and has spoken  at the Omega Institute and for the Edgar Cayce Foundation.

Bowman's book Children's Past Lives received a positive review from Publishers Weekly and was recommended to readers of the new age community.

See also 
 Ian Stevenson
 Reincarnation
 Reincarnation research

References

External links
A Woman's Journey

Psychology educators
Reincarnation
Reincarnation researchers
1950 births
Living people